The 2014 Essendon Football Club season is the club's 116th season in the Australian Football League (AFL).

Squad

Trades

In

Out

Drafts

National Draft

Pre-Season Draft

Rookie Draft

Delisted

Results

Pre-season

Game 1

Game 2

Game 3

Home and Away season

Round 1

Round 2

Round 3

Ladder

Ladder progress

Tribunal cases

Season Statistics

Home attendance

Notes
"Points" refers to carry-over points accrued following the sanction. For example, 154.69 points draw a one-match suspension, with 54.69 carry-over points (for every 100 points, a one-match suspension is given).
Denotes amount of seasons on the  list only.

References

External links
 Official website of the Essendon Football Club
 Official website of the Australian Football League 
 2014 Season scores and results at AFL Tables
 2014 Essendon player statistics at AFL Tables

2014
Essendon Football Club